Melanospilus is a genus of flanged-bombardier beetles or paussines in the family Carabidae, containing the following species: The genus is considered to belong to the subtribe Ceratoderina and all members are thought to be myrmecophiles. The ant host Paratrechina longicornis is known for M. bensoni.

 Melanospilus bensoni 
 Melanospilus borneensis 
 Melanospilus chitwanensis 
 Melanospilus hamaticornis 
 Melanospilus yamasakoi

References

Paussinae